Sidney Darlington (July 18, 1906 – October 31, 1997) was an American electrical engineer and inventor of a transistor configuration in 1953, the Darlington pair. He advanced the state of network theory, developing the insertion-loss synthesis approach, and invented chirp radar, bombsights, and gun and rocket guidance.

Darlington was awarded a B.S. in physics, magna cum laude, from Harvard in 1928, where he was elected to Phi Beta Kappa. He also received a B.S. in E.E. from MIT in 1929, and a Ph.D. in physics from Columbia in 1940.

In 1945, he was awarded the Presidential Medal of Freedom, the United States' highest civilian honor, for his contributions during World War II. He was an elected member of the National Academy of Engineering, which cited his contributions to electrical network theory, radar, and guidance systems. In 1975, he received IEEE's Edison Medal "For basic contributions to network theory and for important inventions in radar systems and electronic circuits" and the IEEE Medal of Honor in 1981 "For fundamental contributions to filtering and signal processing leading to chirp radar".

He died at his home in Exeter, New Hampshire, USA, at the age of 91.

Patents 
 — Wave Transmission Network
 — Semiconductor signal translating devices.(ed., "Darlington Transistor")
 — Bombsight Computer
 — Tracking Device
 — Fire Control Computer
 — Pulse Transmission(Chirp)
 — Rocket Guidance
 — Two-Port Network Synthesis
 — Chirp Pulse Equalizer

References

External links 

IEEE Biography
 Darlington’s Contributions to Transistor Circuit Design
Irwin W. Sandberg and Ernest S. Kuh, "Sidney Darlington", Biographical Memoirs of the National Academy of Sciences (2004)

1906 births
1997 deaths
IEEE Medal of Honor recipients
IEEE Edison Medal recipients
American electrical engineers
Members of the United States National Academy of Engineering
Scientists at Bell Labs
People associated with radar
Scientists from Pittsburgh
Engineers from Pennsylvania
20th-century American engineers
MIT School of Engineering alumni
Columbia Graduate School of Arts and Sciences alumni
Harvard University alumni